The year 1603 in music involved some significant events.

Events 
January 1 – Francesco Soriano is appointed maestro di cappella at St. Peter's Basilica, replacing Asprilio Pacelli
Orlando Gibbons becomes a member of the Chapel Royal.
Giovanni Artusi attacks the "crudities" and "licence" in the works of Claudio Monteverdi.
Sebastian Aguilera de Heredia leaves his post as organist of Huesca Cathedral to become maestro de música at La Seo Cathedral in Saragossa.
Asprilio Pacelli is appointed maestro di capella for King Sigismund III of Poland.

Publications 
Agostino Agazzari
Sacrae laudes... liber secundus (Rome: Aloysio Zannetti)
Sacrarum cantionum... liber tertius (Rome: Aloysio Zannetti)
Gregor Aichinger 
Liturgica sive sacra officia, ad omnes dies festos Magnae Dei Matris per annum celebrari solitos (Augsburg: Johannes Praetorius)
Vespertinum Virginis canticum sive Magnificat... (Augsburg: Johannes Praetorius)
Ghirlanda di canzonette spirituali, for three voices (Augsburg: Johannes Praetorius)
Costanzo Antegnati – Book 14: , motets, and French chansons for three choirs (Venice: Angelo Gardano)
Adriano Banchieri –  for organ and other musical instruments, for four voices (Venice: Ricciardo Amadino)
Giulio Belli –  (Vespers psalms for the feasts of the whole year) for six voices (Venice: Angelo Gardano), also includes three Magnificats
Sethus Calvisius –  for three voices or instruments (Leipzig: Abraham Lamberg for Jacob Apel), a collection of sacred songs in German
Giovanni Croce –  for four voices (Venice: Giacomo Vincenti), music for Holy Week
John Dowland – The third and last booke of songs or aires (London: Peter Short for Thomas Adams)
Johannes Eccard –  for four voices (Königsberg: Georg Osterberger), a wedding song
Christian Erbach –  for four voices (Augsburg: Johann Praetorius)
Achille Falcone – Madrigals for five voices (Venice: Giacomo Vincenti), published posthumously
Stefano Felis – Second book of masses for six voices (Venice: Giacomo Vincenti)
Melchior Franck
 for four voices (Nuremberg: Konrad Baur), a collection of secular partsongs
 for four, five, and six voices (Coburg: Justus Hauck)
 for four voices (Coburg: Justus Hauck)
Bartholomäus Gesius –  for four voices (Frankfurt an der Oder: Friedrich Hartmann)
Carlo Gesualdo – , 2 vols. (Naples: Costantino Vitale)
Claude Le Jeune –  (The Spring) for two, three, four, five, six, seven, and eight voices (Paris: the widow of R. Ballard and his son Pierre Ballard), a collection of airs, published posthumously
Carolus Luython –  for six voices (Prague: Georg Nigrinus), a collection of motets)
Ascanio Mayone –  (Naples: Costantino Vitale), a collection of keyboard music
Rogier Michael –  for five voices (Leipzig: Abraham Lamberg), a collection of motets
Claudio Monteverdi –  (Fourth book of madrigals for five voices) (Venice: Ricciardo Amadino)
Pomponio Nenna – Fifth book of madrigals for five voices (Naples: Giovanni Battista Sottile)
Giovanni Pierluigi da Palestrina — , published posthumously (Antwerp: Pierre Phalèse)
Benedetto Pallavicino – First book of masses (Venice: Ricciardo Amadino)
Tomaso Pecci
 (Venice: Giacomo Vincenti)
First book of canzonettas for three voices (Venice: Giacomo Vincenti), also contains one piece by Giulio Giuliani
Peter Philips – Second book of madrigals for six voices (Antwerp: Pierre Phalèse)
Orfeo Vecchi
First book of Magnificats for five voices (Milan: Agostino Tradate)
First book of motets for four voices (Milan: Agostini Tradate)
 for six voices (Antwerp: Pierre Phalèse)

Classical music 
Tomás Luis de Victoria – , composed for the funeral obsequies of Maria of Austria, Holy Roman Empress, performed on April 22 and 23

Opera 
none listed

Births 
March 18 – King John IV of Portugal, composer, patron of music and the arts, and writer on music (died 1656)
November – Francesco Foggia, composer (died 1688)
date unknown
Denis Gaultier, French lutenist and composer (died 1672)
William Smith, liturgical composer (died 1645)
probable – Benedetto Ferrari, composer and theorbo player (died 1681)

Deaths 
June – Baldassare Donato, composer and singer (born 1525–1530)
July 4 – Philippe de Monte, Flemish composer (born 1521)
August 2 – Rinaldo dall'Arpa, composer, singer and harpist
August 16 – Cardinal Silvio Antoniani, amateur musician (born 1540)
September 25 – Stefano Felis, Neapolitan composer and music teacher (born c.1538)
October 23 – Johann Wanning, Dutch-born composer, kapellmeister and alto singer (born 1537)
date unknown – Ambrosio Cotes, Spanish composer (born c.1550)

References 

 
Music
17th century in music
Music by year